Link Island is a small island at the outer (northern) margin of the Duroch Islands, approximately  northwest of Halpern Point, Trinity Peninsula, Antarctica. The island was charted by the Chilean Antarctic Expedition, 1947–48, and called "Islote Sub-Teniente Ross" or "Islote Ross." The Advisory Committee on Antarctic Names named it after David A. Link, a field assistant with the University of Wisconsin (United States Antarctic Research Program) geological party during reconnaissance of this area, 1960–61, this name avoiding possible confusion with James Ross Island.

See also 
 List of Antarctic and sub-Antarctic islands

References

Islands of the Duroch Islands